Apollo is an optical submarine communications cable system crossing the Atlantic Ocean, owned by Apollo Submarine Cable System Ltd (a joint venture between Cable & Wireless Worldwide and Alcatel).   It consists of 2 segments North and South, creating two fully diverse transatlantic paths.

In early 2006, Level 3 Communications announced its purchase of 300 Gbit/s of capacity between Apollo North and Apollo South with an option to purchase up 300 Gbit/s of future capacity. This acquisition gives Level 3 a transatlantic path that does not pass through either London or New York City, which is desirable to carriers due to network diversity concerns. This purchase represents the single largest transaction of sub-sea capacity in history without laying new cable.

Principal access points
Apollo has principal access points at the following locations:
United States
 111 8th Avenue
 60 Hudson Street
 165 Halsey Street
 2100 M Street, Washington DC
 Equinix, Ashburn
 US cable stations in Shirley, New York and Manasquan, New Jersey

United Kingdom	
 Telehouse West
 Global Switch
 Telecity Harbour Exchange
 Cable station in Cornwall
 Equinix, Slough

France
 Global Switch
 Interxion
 SFR Netcenter
 Telehouse 1, 2 and 3
 Equinix, Paris

Security breach
In February 2018, The Sunday Times reported that the infrastructure for the UK landing site of the Apollo, GLO-1 and Europe India Gateway cables had been found almost entirely unprotected. Their reporter was able to reach the premises without being challenged, and found the door to the generator room unlocked and left ajar. Vodafone, who manage the facility, said that he had not reached critical equipment and "would not have been able to interrupt the operation of the facility."

References

External links 
 http://transition.fcc.gov/Bureaus/International/Orders/2001/da011395.txt

Submarine communications cables in the North Atlantic Ocean
United Kingdom–United States relations
France–United States relations
France–United Kingdom relations
2003 establishments in England
2003 establishments in France
2003 establishments in New Jersey
2003 establishments in New York (state)